Cedros Island (Isla de Cedros, "island of cedars" in Spanish) is an island in the Pacific Ocean belonging to the state of Baja California, Mexico. The economy is based on commercial fishing and salt production. Cedros has a distinctive flora and the traces of some of the earliest human beings in the New World. The ocean around the island is popular with sport fishermen.

There was human presence of the island already about 11,000 years ago. The American Indian inhabitants when the island was first visited by Spanish explorers in the 16th century called it Huamalgua, the "Island of Fogs."  The Indian inhabitants have been given the name Huamalgueños by modern day scholars. They were relocated to the mainland of Baja California by Jesuit missionaries in 1732 and ceased to exist as an identifiable people.

Geography

Cedros Island is located in Ensenada Municipality, off the west coast of the Mexican state of Baja California, from which it is separated by  Sebastián Vizcaíno Bay.

Between Cedros Island and Isla Natividad runs the 28th parallel north, which defines the border between the Mexican states of Baja California and Baja California Sur.

The Isla de Cedros was named by early Spanish explorers who mistakenly associated the large amounts of redwood and cedar driftwood arriving with the California current for local pines visible on the crest of the island.

The two main elevations are Cedros hill, located at the south-center of the island, and Pico Gill to the north.

Climate
Cedros Island has a desert climate, BWh in the Köppen climate classification system and BWab (desert, hot summers, warm winters) in the Trewartha climate classification. Most precipitation occurs during the winter.

The only weather station on the island is located on the southeastern coast. The northern and western parts of the island are several degrees cooler because the cold waters surrounding the island cause heavy fog and clouds, especially during spring and summer. The condensation from the fog permits lusher vegetation to flourish, similar to the "fog oases" (lomas) of the arid Pacific Coast of South America. Rarely, heavy rains caused by unstable tropical air masses and chubascos cause flooding.

Population and settlements 

It constitutes one of the 24 subdivisions (delegaciones) of the municipio of Ensenada.  The 2005 census showed a total population of 1,350 persons.

The borough "seat" is Cedros, also known as Isla Cedros or Cedros town ("Pueblo Cedros"), on the southeast coast. The town was founded by fishermen in 1922, and in 2010 the town had a population of 747 people. The local economy is dependent on fishing, and largely associated with Pescadores Nacionales de Abulón, the lobster and abalone fishing cooperative based on the island.  

The second town is Puerto Morro Redondo (in short, El Morro), close to the southeastern point of the island, El Morro. It is a "company town," built by the joint Mexican Government and Mitsubishi Corporation to house the workers of the salt-transshipment facility on the island. Salt from the salt evaporation ponds of Guerrero Negro on the Baja California peninsula is taken by barge to a deepwater salt dock near Puerto Morro Redondo, at the south end of Cedros Island, where it is loaded onto ships for export. There is regularly scheduled air service to the island from Ensenada, departing every Monday and Wednesday, and landing at an airstrip at the south end, adjacent to the "company town," while a  road leads to "Pueblo Cedros". Open launch rides across the channel between Cedros and the mainland can also be arranged at the Abarrotes Ramales store in Bahia Tortugas, but travellers opting for this transport should be prepared to have a flexible schedule with several extra days in case of inclement weather conditions in the Channel.

The remaining settlements are smaller. Jerusalem is just west of El Morro, but on the western side of the airport, with regularly arranged residential units. It is frequently considered part of El Morro.

Lomas Blancas, a mining town with 17 buildings, is located between Cedros town and El Morro.

List of settlements and locations:
Cedros, 
Puerto Morro Redondo, 
Jerusalem, 
Lomas Blancas, 
San Agustín, 
La Colorada, 
Wayle, 
Punta Norte,

Archaeology

The long-held theory that the first human beings in the Americas arrived by land through an ice-free corridor in western Canada has been called into question by archaeological discoveries along the Pacific coastlines of North and South America.  Many scientists now believe that the earliest inhabitants arrived by boat, and findings on Cedros Island bolster that theory. The Clovis culture, which began about 11,200 BCE, is the earliest universally acknowledged evidence of man in the Americas; but the remains of ancient people dating to earlier than 10,000 BCE have been found on Cedros Island.  Cedros Island was attractive to humans because of its rich marine environment and its relative abundance of water compared to most of the desert coastline of Baja California.  The early people of Cedros Island fished, gathered shellfish, and hunted seals, sea lions, and seabirds. Ancient spear points and shell fishhooks found on Cedros are similar to those found in a semi-circle of the Pacific coastline from Okinawa to Peru. The fishhooks made of shell found on Cedros Island indicate a marine, sea-going culture some 6,000 years before similar cultures are known to have existed on the coast and islands of California.

Earliest fishhooks in the Americas
The discovery of the earliest fishhooks in the Americas was reported from Cedros Island in 2017. They date to about 11,000 B.P. The people making these fishhooks were fishing for deepwater species, which indicates that they were using boats.

Similar fishhooks have also been reported from Isla Espíritu Santo, also in Baja California.

History

 Spanish colonial period
In 1539, when the Spanish expedition led by Francisco de Ulloa landed on the island, it encountered several villages with populations at each estimated in the hundreds.  Finding it difficult to reach the remaining Indians on the island, the Jesuit missionaries practiced Indian reductions and brought them all to Misión San Ignacio Kadakaamán, in San Ignacio on the Baja California mainland in 1732.

Hunters seeking seals and sea otters worked out the island between 1790 and 1850.

20th century
Gold and copper mining took place near Punta Norte between 1890 and 1914.  The fishing village and cannery at Puerto Cedros were established in 1920.  The fishing cooperative was founded in 1943, and the deepwater salt dock at the south end of the island was built in 1966. The island was mapped in detail by Mexican and U.S. geologists during the 1970s.

Natural history 
The island consists of a variety of sedimentary, metamorphic, and igneous rocks, including part of an ophiolite complex and high-pressure, low temperature blueschists. Most of the rocks are of Mesozoic age, though some late Cenozoic strata crop out near the town in the southeastern corner of the island.

Flora
The most common vegetation for more than 90 percent of the land on the island is desert scrub of many different species. The lower elevations, especially the south, receive very sparse rainfall. However, the northern and western parts of the island are often shrouded in fog, and some plants have adapted to receiving moisture from fog. The pine forests are scattered and only cover 0.46 percent of the total area of the island. California juniper are also found at similar altitudes, covering 0.05 percent of the land area.

At the highest elevations of the island, above and mixed in with the pine forests, chaparral vegetation is found.  The chaparral averages  in height and consists of several woody species including Quercus cedrosensis, the Cedar Island live oak. Chaparral covers 2.4 percent of the land area of Cedros Island.

Vargas or El Aguaje de Vargas is the most important spring, with a flow of 180 drums of 200 L or 55 US gal every 12 hours; springs on the island are usually marked by groves of palm trees.

Fauna
Large sea lion colonies are found on the rocks on the west side as well as the anchorage on the north end.

There are feral goats on Cedros. Unlike on other islands in the region (notably Guadalupe Island), they do not seem to have had a significant impact on the island ecosystem. This would be due to the fact that Cedros is on the continental shelf close to the coast and, at least temporarily, it was connected to the mainland during the last ice age when sea levels were lower than today. Then, and as a consequence of this, there are native Cedros herbivores, such as Cedros Island mule deer which on one hand compete with the goat population for food and presumably have kept it from increasing beyond carrying capacity, and on the other hand forced the native plants to keep their defenses against herbivores, unlike plants on islands without megaherbivores, which tend to lack those defenses.

Fish are abundant around Cedros Island. California yellowtail, a subspecies of yellowtail amberjack, are very plentiful in the waters around the island, as it is their breeding ground. These fish like to live in the kelp beds of the island. Other fish, such as calico bass and sheepshead are also very plentiful near the island.

Endemism 
Cedros Island is home to a number of taxa that are endemic or occur in very few places outside the island. These include:

Animals
 Cedros side-blotched lizard, Uta stansburiana concinna - endemic
 Cedros Island Bewick's wren, Thryomanes bewickii cerroensis - near-endemic
 Cedros Island mule deer, Odocoileus hemionus cerrosensis - endemic
 Cedros Island brush rabbit, Sylvilagus bachmani cerrosensis - endemic -
 Cedros Island cactus mouse, Peromyscus eremicus cedrosensis - endemic -

Plants
Cryptantha maritima var. cedrosensis - endemic
Dudleya cedrosensis - endemic
 Dudleya pachyphytum (Cedros Island Liveforever) - endemic
 Eriogonum molle (Cedros soft buckwheat) - endemic
 Ferocactus chrysacanthus - endemic
 Harfordia macroptera ssp. fruticosa - endemic
 Linanthus veatchii - endemic
 Lotus cedrosensis - endemic
 Mammillaria goodridgei var. goodridgei - endemic
 Mammillaria goodridgei var. rectispina - endemic
 Mimulus stellatus - endemic
 Monardella thymifolia - endemic
 Penstemon cedrosensis - endemic
 Pinus radiata var. binata (Guadalupe Island Monterey pine) — near-endemic; possibly separable as var./ssp. cedrosensis and in this case endemic.
 Porophyllum cedrense - endemic
 Quercus cedrosensis (Cedros Island oak) — near-endemic
 Rhus integrifolia var. cedrosensis - endemic
 Salvia cedrosensis (Cedros Island sage) - endemic
 Senecio cedrosensis - endemic
 Verbesina hastata - endemic
Xylonagra arborea ssp. arborea - endemic

See also
History of the west coast of North America
Isla de Cedros Airport

Footnotes

References 
  (2007): Plant accounts: Guadalupe Island. Retrieved 2007-OCT-10.
  (2007): Principales resultados por localidad 2005 (ITER) ["Principal results of the 2005 census by locality"] [in Spanish]. Retrieved 2007-OCT-10.
  (2007): [Google Earth satellite image of Cedros Island]. Retrieved 2007-OCT-10.
  (1907): Birds Collected by W. W. Brown, Jr., on Cerros , San Benito and Natividad Islands in the Spring of 1906, with Notes on the Biota of the Islands. Condor 9(3): 77-81.  PDF fulltext
 Des Lauriers, Matthew R., Island of Fogs: Archaeological and Ethnohistorical Investigations of Isla Cedros, Baja, 2010. 
Land area of islands in Mexico INEGI

External links 

 Mexico Desconocido Article in Spanish.
 Baja Quest Article about Cedros Island.
 Globe Trotters Travel Travelogs Travel experience to Cedros Island.
 Geologic Map
 Mining Map
 geology and minerals information

 
Islands of Ensenada Municipality
California chaparral and woodlands